Shigeharu Mukai J Quintet featuring Junko Onishi is an album by Japanese jazz trombonist Shigeharu Mukai, released on April 28, 1999 on somethin`else (Toshiba EMI).

Track listing

Personnel
Shigeharu Mukai - trombone
Mabumi Yamaguchi - Tenor saxophone
Junko Onishi - Piano
Rodney Whitaker - Bass
Greg Hutchinson - Drums

Production
Co-producer - Shigeharu Mukai and Sentimental Family
Executive Producer - Hitoshi Namekata
Recording and Mixing Engineer - Masuzo Iida
Assistant Engineer - Yoshiyuki Yokoyama, Hideki Kodera, Taizo Sugihara
Recorded on November 25 & 26, 1993 at Woodstock Karuizawa Studio
Mixed on December 5, 1993 at Toshiba EMI Studios 3, Tokyo
Mastering engineer - Yoshio Okazaki
Frontcover photograph - Rice Yoneda
Backcover photograph - Fumiaki Fujimoto
Art director - Kaoru Taku
A&R - Yoshiko Tsuge
 Liner notes - Fumiaki Fujimoto

Release history

References

External links
 Universal Music Shigeharu Mukai J Quintet featuring Junko Onishi

1994 albums
Shigeharu Mukai albums
Junko Onishi albums